Tochara is a genus of moths of the family Erebidae.

This genus resembles Hypospila with the differences of a long, bipectinated antennae in the male, a longer third segment of the labial palps and a distinctive dark spot on the hindwings.

Species
 Tochara creberrima (Walker, 1858) (from India to Japan and Australia)
 Tochara olivacea (Holloway, 1976) (from Borneo)

References

 Natural History Museum Lepidoptera genus database

 
Acantholipini
Moth genera